Dancehall Places is the second studio album by English electronic dance music duo Mint Royale, which was released on 28 October 2002 on Faith & Hope.

Reception
BBC's Collective gave solid approval to the album, commenting, "Dancehall Places is filled with 'paaarty toons' which put you in a dancing mood even if they are a bit cheesy." They also noted the greater "depth and intelligence" of the slower songs.

In popular culture
The song "Show Me" was included in the US version of their debut album "On the Ropes" (1999) and is featured in the National Lampoon productions movie Van Wilder (2002), (although it is not included on the official soundtrack). The track samples the song "Sesiya Hamba" from the musical Ipi Tombi.

The music video for "Blue Song" was directed by Edgar Wright, who made the video using his original concept for his later film Baby Driver.

Track listing
All songs were written by Chris Baker and Neil Claxton, except where noted.
 "Blue Song" – 4:16
 "Sexiest Man in Jamaica" featuring Prince Buster (Baker, Buster, Claxton) – 3:26
 "Anything" (Baker, Claxton, Paxman, Judie Tzuke) – 4:34
 "Floor Basics" featuring Gail Hebson – 3:54
 "Dancehall Places" featuring Damien Jurado (Baker, Claxton, Jurado) – 3:53
 "Miles and Miles" featuring Gail Hebson – 4:25
 "Princess" featuring Robbie Roberts and Gail Hebson (Baker, Claxton, Hebson) – 4:28
 "Show Me" featuring Posdnuos (Baker, Claxton, Egnos, Lakier) – 4:01
 "54" (Baker, Claxton, Muller) – 4:39
 "I Don't Know" featuring Gail Hebson – 5:14
 "Always Welcome" (Baker, Claxton, Kenneth Gamble, Leon Huff, McLaughlin) – 3:37

Personnel

Mint Royale
 Neil Claxton - producer, mixing, keyboards, programming
 Chris Baker - producer, keyboards, engineering, bass

Other musicians
 Laurie Jenkins - drums (1)
 Victor Smalls - percussion (2, 4, 6)
 Steven Wren - vocals (1)
 Prince Buster - vocals (2)
 Pos - raps (8)
 Robbie Roberts - vocals (7)
 Gail Hebson - vocals, backing vocals (4, 7, 10)
 Damien Jurado - vocals, acoustic guitar (5)
 Jez Williams – guitars (5)

Other personnel
 Steve Dub – mixing
 Greg Fleming – assistant
 Tim Young – mastering
 Tasha Michaels – artwork
 Unit9 – artwork, layout design

References

Mint Royale albums
2002 albums